Prince Fahmi Said Ibrahim El Maceli is a Comorian and French lawyer and politician. He is the son of Said Ibrahim of Grand Comore former president of Comoros Island. Prince Fahmi Said Ibrahim was the foreign minister of the Comoros from 2010 to 2011.

References

Year of birth missing (living people)
Candidates for President of the Comoros
Living people
Comorian politicians
Comorian diplomats
Foreign ministers of the Comoros
Government ministers of the Comoros